The Men's 1 km time trial event at the 2010 South American Games was held on March 21.

Medalists

Results

References
Report

Kilometer
Men's time trial (track cycling)